Ola Abu Al Ghaib or Ola Abualghaib is a Palestinian disability rights advocate. In August 2019, she was appointed Manager of the Technical Secretariat of the United Nations Partnership on the Rights of Persons with Disabilities (UNPRPD).

Abu Al Ghaib led the organization's development and implementation of the Strategic Operational Framework (SOF) for 2020–2025, which positions the United Nations Partnership on the Rights of Persons with Disabilities Multi-Partner Trust Fund (UNPRPD MPTF) as a key player in supporting countries advancing disability inclusion. Under her direction, over 40 joint programmes have been launched and approved across five regions.

Abu Al Ghaib was featured in Apolitical's Gender Equality Top 100 list of the most influential people in global policy in 2019.

Early life and education 

Born in Nablus, West Bank, Palestine, Abu Al Ghaib was twelve when she lost the use of her legs. Owing to these life-changing circumstances, she was forced to stay home for three years without schooling. When nearby schools declined to enroll her due to her health conditions, she moved to Bethlehem, where she enrolled in a private school. Initially an observational student, she was officially accepted after earning the highest marks in her class.

During high school, Abu Al Ghaib worked with the physiotherapy department at Bethlehem University to include disabled characters in a few well-known children's stories. She was awarded a scholarship from the Palestinian Ministry of Social Affairs and a German organization for the disabled in recognition of her active role within the disabled students' community in Palestine.

Abu Al Ghaib went on to obtain a bachelor's degree in English Literature and Education from Bethlehem University, a master's degree in project management from Bir Zeit University at Ramallah, a master's degree in Power, Participation and Social Change Institute of Development Studies from Sussex University, and a Ph.D. in Social Protection Policies and Disabilities in Lower Middle-Income Countries from East Anglia University.

Career 

Abu Al Ghaib started her career advocating for her right to an accessible campus during her university studies. Her efforts earned her a position on the campus construction committee, through which she adapted the university campus to disabled students.

In Palestine, Abu Al Ghaib founded the Stars of Hope Society, an organization aimed at addressing the needs of women with disabilities and supporting them in realizing their rights. 

She has played a key role in promoting the rights of persons with disabilities, particularly women with disabilities, in development in fragile and crisis-affected settings in the Arab States, Africa and Asia.

Throughout her career, Abu Al Ghaib has supported mainstreaming disability inclusion in collaboration with the United Nations system at national, regional, and international levels. She has worked as a consultant with the World Bank and other United Nations agencies, including the World Health Organization (WHO); International Labour Organization (ILO); United Nations Educational, Scientific and Cultural Organization (UNESCO); and United Nations Children's Fund (UNICEF).

Before joining UNPRPD MPTF, Abu Al Ghaib was the Deputy Director of LCD International and Global Head of Influencing, Impact, and Learning at Leonard Cheshire Disability – UK from 2016 to 2018, when she was promoted to Global Director. Her responsibilities included policy analyses, program design, management evaluation, research, and the creation of advocacy strategies. She led the organization's efforts in disability-inclusive development.

In 2019, Abu Al Ghaib was appointed Manager of the Technical Secretariat of the UNPRPD MTPF.

Other activities and recognitions 

 Board Member at the Global Disability and Innovation Hub – London (2017–present)
 Vice Chair at the International Disability and Development Consortium (IDDC) Brussels (2017–2019)
 Core Group Member at Together2030, New York, USA (2017–2019)
 Board Member at ADD UK (2015–2017)
 Synergos Fellow (Arab World Social Innovators – AWSI) (2011)
 International Woman of Courage Award awarded by the American Consulate (2011)
 Board Member at the Disability Rights Fund Boston, USA (2008–2020)
 Ashoka Fellow (Social Entrepreneur) (2007)
 Global advisory member at UK Research and Innovation (UKRI) and Fordham University (USA)
 Visiting lecturer at the School of International Development at the University of East Anglia

Publications

References

External links 
Official website of UNPRPD

Living people
Palestinian disability rights activists
Place of birth missing (living people)
Year of birth missing (living people)
United Nations officials
Palestinian women
Ashoka Fellows